2862 Vavilov, provisional designation , is a stony background asteroid and exceptionally slow rotator from the inner regions of the asteroid belt, approximately 7 kilometers in diameter. It was discovered on 15 May 1977, by Soviet astronomer Nikolai Chernykh at the Crimean Astrophysical Observatory in Nauchnij, on the Crimean peninsula. The asteroid was named after Russian plant geneticist Nikolai Vavilov and his physicist brother Sergey Ivanovich Vavilov.

Orbit and classification 

Vavilov is located in the dynamical region of the Flora family, a giant asteroid family and the largest family of stony asteroids in the main-belt. However, it is a non-family asteroid of the main belt's background population when applying the hierarchical clustering method to its proper orbital elements.

It orbits the Sun in the inner main-belt at a distance of 1.9–2.5 AU once every 3 years and 3 months (1,193 days). Its orbit has an eccentricity of 0.11 and an inclination of 3° with respect to the ecliptic.

Physical characteristics 

Vavilov is an assumed stony S-type asteroid, which is also the overall spectral type for members of the Flora family.

Rotation period 

In February 2006, a rotational lightcurve of Vavilov was obtained from photometric observations by Petr Pravec at Ondřejov Observatory in the Czech Republic. Lightcurve analysis gave a rotation period of 800 hours with a brightness amplitude of at least 0.4 magnitude

With a period above 500 hours, Vavilov is one of only a few dozen slow rotators with such an extreme spin rate currently known to exists.

Diameter and albedo 

According to the surveys carried out by the Japanese Akari satellite and the NEOWISE mission of NASA's Wide-field Infrared Survey Explorer, Vavilov measures between 6.031 and 7.95 kilometers in diameter and its surface has an albedo between 0.21 and 0.404.

The Collaborative Asteroid Lightcurve Link assumes an albedo of 0.24 – derived from 8 Flora, the Flora family's parent body – and calculates a diameter of 7.82 kilometers based on an absolute magnitude of 12.7.

Naming 

This minor planet was named in memory of Russian plant geneticist Nikolai Vavilov (1887–1943) and his physicist brother Sergey Ivanovich Vavilov (1891-1951). The official naming citation was published by the Minor Planet Center on 18 September 1986. The lunar crater Vavilov was also named in their honor.

Notes

References

External links 
 Asteroid Lightcurve Database (LCDB), query form (info )
 Dictionary of Minor Planet Names, Google books
 Asteroids and comets rotation curves, CdR – Observatoire de Genève, Raoul Behrend
 Discovery Circumstances: Numbered Minor Planets (1)-(5000) – Minor Planet Center
 
 

002862
Discoveries by Nikolai Chernykh
Named minor planets
002862
19770515